The 1964 Virginia Cavaliers football team represented the University of Virginia during the 1964 NCAA University Division football season. The Cavaliers were led by fourth-year head coach Bill Elias and played their home games at Scott Stadium in Charlottesville, Virginia. They competed as members of the Atlantic Coast Conference, finishing in last. Elias left at the conclusion of the season to accept a one-year head coaching contract at the United States Naval Academy. He had an overall record of 16–23–1 at Virginia and failed to produce a winning season.

Schedule

References

Virginia
Virginia Cavaliers football seasons
Virginia Cavaliers football